Lee Joo-hyung (born 5 March 1973) is a Korean former gymnast who competed in the 1992 Summer Olympics, in the 1996 Summer Olympics, and in the 2000 Summer Olympics.

His brother Lee Jang-hyung is also an artistic gymnast.

Education
Daeryun High School

References

External links
 
 

1973 births
Living people
South Korean male artistic gymnasts
Olympic gymnasts of South Korea
Gymnasts at the 1992 Summer Olympics
Gymnasts at the 1996 Summer Olympics
Gymnasts at the 2000 Summer Olympics
Olympic silver medalists for South Korea
Olympic bronze medalists for South Korea
Olympic medalists in gymnastics
Asian Games medalists in gymnastics
Gymnasts at the 1990 Asian Games
Gymnasts at the 1994 Asian Games
Gymnasts at the 1998 Asian Games
Medalists at the 2000 Summer Olympics
Asian Games gold medalists for South Korea
Asian Games silver medalists for South Korea
Asian Games bronze medalists for South Korea
Medalists at the 1990 Asian Games
Medalists at the 1994 Asian Games
Medalists at the 1998 Asian Games
Medalists at the World Artistic Gymnastics Championships
21st-century South Korean people